Lieutenant Mikhail Ivanovich Safonov (13 November 1893 – May 1924) was a World War I flying ace credited with five aerial victories. He began his naval service on 20 September 1909, when he entered Saint Peterburg's Imperial Russian Naval Academy. When he applied for aviation training in September 1915, he was a professional sailor with six years naval training and seagoing service.

On 1 December 1915, he soloed. On 2 April 1916, he was classified as a naval pilot. He was posted to pilot Grigorovich M-9 flying boats that mounted a Madsen machine gun. After two aerial victories while piloting flying boats, with consequent decorations for valor, Safonov was appointed to command his Glagol Detachment on 14 July 1917. He gained access to a Nieuport fighter, which he used for his third victory on 7 September 1917. After a promotion to Senior Lieutenant on 25 October, he married while on a brief leave. He returned to command the 2nd Fighter Detachment and score two more aerial victories with the Nieuport. He was mustered out in March 1918.

Safonov then became an itinerant aerial mercenary in the Finnish Civil War. In 1919, he changed loyalties to join the White Russians. After travelling with his wife through Persia and India, he joined Britain's Royal Air Force. In May 1924, he was killed in a flying accident in China.

Biography

Early life and service

Mikhail Ivanovich Safonov was born into nobility on 13 November 1893 in Ostrogozhsk, the Russian Empire. He was a Russian Orthodox adherent. As a child, he was educated in the Ostrogozhsk Gymnasium. He entered Saint Peterburg's Imperial Russian Naval Academy on 20 September 1909. He would serve on half a dozen ships while training. On 21 February 1913, he received a Bronze Medal marking 300 years rule by the House of Romanov; in April 1913, he received another Bronze Medal commemorating the hundredth anniversary of the Fatherland War.

World War I service

He graduated as a Warrant Officer in May 1914, and was posted to the battleship Gromoboi on 2 August 1914. On 30 September 1914, he was transferred to another battleship, the Sevastopol. In September 1915, he applied for a transfer to aviation service.

On 24 November 1915, he was assigned to the Officer's School of Naval Aviation for the Baltic Fleet and forwarded to the Polytechnic Institute of Peter the Great in Saint Petersburg to study aerodynamics. After mastering this, he moved to the winter location of the school in Baku to pass all the examinations to qualify as a pilot. On 1 December 1915, he soloed.

On 24 February 1916, Safonov was posted to the Liaison/Signal Service Corps of the Baltic Fleet. During March, he polished his piloting skills at the Tallinn Naval Air Station. He was then tasked to fly Farman MF.11 float plane serial no. 31 for the local Third Air Station. On 2 April 1916, he was classified as a naval pilot at the annual salary of 960 rubles. The Air Arm of the Baltic Fleet was organised into two Air Divisions. Safonov was assigned to the First Air Detachment (Glagol) of the 2nd Air Division on 11 August 1916. The Grigorovich M-9 flying boats equipping this detachment mounted a Madsen machine gun.

After several air combats, including his first aerial victory on 9 September 1916, he was awarded the Order of Saint Anne Fourth Class and the Order of Saint Vladimir Third Class with Swords and Bow. He was wounded in action on 13 September 1916 while flying Grigorovich M-9 serial no. 39.

Safonov was appointed as a lieutenant on 10 July 1917. He was selected to command the Glagol Detachment on 14 July 1917. He scored his second aerial victory that day, this time using a Grigorovich M-15, even though the enemy plane was not seen to crash. At 1140 hours on 7 September, Safonov used Nieuport serial no. NR-1 in an attack on an enemy two-seater. He closed to 50 meters range, and fired a short burst for his third victory. On 25 October, Safonov was promoted to Senior Lieutenant and granted a short leave. He married Ludmila Tschebotarioff. Upon his return to duty, he was posted to command the 2nd Land Fighter Detachment at Kuivastoin.

He scored two more aerial victories on successive days, 16 and 17 November 1917. However, the Russian Revolution ended his war then; Safonov was inactive until discharged from the military by the Bolsheviks in March 1918. As Russia was wracked by revolution, Finland declared its independence on 6 December 1917. Safonov was one of five Russian pilots approached by a cabal of Finnish activists; they offered 25,000 rubles and Finnish citizenship if the pilots would serve in General Mannerheim's air force.

On 11 April 1918, the newly civilianised Safonov tucked his wife into a Nieuport 10 and took off to join the Finns. While flying reconnaissance flights in the Finnish Civil War, he used the nom de guerre Mikko Vuorenheimo. However, by Summer 1918, the distrustful Finns had not kept their bargain, so Safonov wangled the permits needed to transit German-occupied Russia and join the White Russians' Volunteer Army.

Post World War I

By 1919, Safonov was serving in the Volunteer Army of the White Russians' under General Anton Denikin. After their defeat, continuing his career as an itinerant pilot, Safonov and wife moved on to Persia and India; Safonov joined the Royal Air Force in the latter. After that, he ended up in China in 1924, organising aviation training for the Chinese Navy. In May 1924, while testing a flying boat over the Ming River, he was killed in a flying accident. Some years later, his widow and two orphans would resettle in the United States.

List of aerial victories
See also Aerial victory standards of World War I, List of World War I flying aces from the Russian Empire

Confirmed victories are numbered and listed chronologically.

Honors and awards

 Bronze Medal marking 300 years rule by the House of Romanov: 21 February 1913
 Bronze Medal commemorating the hundredth anniversary of the Fatherland War: April 1913
 Order of Saint Anne Fourth Class with inscription "For Bravery": 19 September 1916
 Order of Saint Stanilas Third Class with Swords and Bow: 19 October 1916
 Order of Saint Vladimir Fourth Class with Swords and Ribbon: 14 November 1916, by order no. 380 by Commander in Chief of the Naval Staff
 Order of Saint Vladimir Third Class with Swords and Ribbon: 5 February 1917

Endnotes

References

 Allen Durkota; Thomas Darcey; Victor Kulikov. The Imperial Russian Air Service: Famous Pilots and Aircraft and World War I. Flying Machines Press, 1995. , 9780963711021.
 Norman Franks; Russell Guest; Gregory Alegi. Above the War Fronts: The British Two-seater Bomber Pilot and Observer Aces, the British Two-seater Fighter Observer Aces, and the Belgian, Italian, Austro-Hungarian and Russian Fighter Aces, 1914–1918: Volume 4 of Fighting Airmen of WWI Series: Volume 4 of Air Aces of WWI. Grub Street, 1997. , .

1893 births
1924 deaths
People from Ostrogozhsky District
People from Ostrogozhsky Uyezd
Russian aviators
Aerial warfare pioneers
Russian World War I flying aces
Aviators killed in aviation accidents or incidents in China
Russian military personnel of World War I
Recipients of the Order of St. Anna, 4th class
Recipients of the Order of St. Vladimir, 4th class
Recipients of the Order of St. Vladimir, 3rd class
Imperial Russian Air Force personnel
Royal Air Force officers
Victims of aviation accidents or incidents in 1924
White Russian emigrants to China